Ebrima Colley (born 1 February 2000) is a Gambian professional footballer who plays as a winger for Turkish club Fatih Karagümrük on loan from Serie A club Atalanta, and the Gambia national team.

Club career
Colley started playing for Atalanta's under-19 squad in the 2017–18 season. He made his professional debut for the senior team in a 1–2 Serie A loss to Bologna on 15 December 2019.

On 23 September 2020, Colley joined Hellas Verona on loan for the remainder of the season.

On 7 August 2021, Colley joined Spezia on loan.

On 13 August 2022, Colley was loaned to Fatih Karagümrük in Turkey.

International career
Colley made his debut for the Gambia national football team on 22 March 2019 in an Africa Cup of Nations qualifier against Algeria, as a 81st-minute substitute for Ebrima Sohna.

He played in the 2021 Africa cup of Nations, his national team's first continental tournament, where they made a sensational quarter-final.

Career statistics

References

External links
 

2000 births
People from Serekunda
Living people
Gambian footballers
The Gambia international footballers
Serie A players
Atalanta B.C. players
Hellas Verona F.C. players
Spezia Calcio players
Fatih Karagümrük S.K. footballers
Association football midfielders
2021 Africa Cup of Nations players
Gambian expatriate footballers
Expatriate footballers in Italy
Gambian expatriate sportspeople in Italy
Expatriate footballers in Turkey
Gambian expatriate sportspeople in Turkey